Lovebird is a group of small parrots.

Lovebird or Love Bird, or Lovebirds or Love Birds may refer to:

People
William F. Allen (Delaware), American businessman and politician nicknamed "Lovebird"

Films
Love Birds (1934 film), an American film
Love Birds (1996 film), a Tamil musical-comedy film
Love Birds (2011 film), a New Zealand romantic comedy film
The Lovebirds (2007 film), a Portuguese drama film
The Lovebirds (2020 film), an American comedy film

Stage
Love Birds (musical), a 2015 stage musical written by Robert J. Sherman, or its title song

Music

Albums
Lovebird, by Kohmi Hirose
Reincarnation of a Lovebird, Charles Mingus 1970

Songs
"Lovebird" (song), by Leona Lewis
"Lovebird", song by Manfred Mann from Up the Junction (1968)
"Lovebird", song by John Entwistle from Too Late the Hero (1981)
"Lovebird", song by Jann Browne from Tell Me Why (1990)
"Lovebird", a song from the musical Steel Pier
"Lovebirds", song by the British indie group Dodgy from The Dodgy Album (1993)
"Lovebirds", song by Hot Snakes from Audit in Progress (2004)
"Lovebirds", song by Game from Purp & Patron (2011)
"Lovebirds", song by Ronald & Ruby